Maroondah Highway (also known as Whitehorse Road from Deepdene to Mitcham) is a major east–west thoroughfare in the eastern suburbs of Melbourne, and a highway connecting the north-eastern fringes of Melbourne to the lower alpine region of Victoria, Australia.

Route

Whitehorse Road/Maroondah Hwy begins as a continuation of Cotham Road at Burke Road, through the suburbs of Balwyn and Deepdene. At this point, it is a typical inner-Melbourne, four lane, single carriageway arterial road.  The route 109 tram also runs along this stretch of the road.
The road continues through Mont Albert, until its intersection with Elgar Road in Box Hill, where the road becomes a four lane dual carriageway with trams running down the central median strip. Burke Road and Elgar Roads being the east and west boundaries of Captain Elgar's original two mile square property. The tram terminates at Market Street, a few blocks further on. It passes through the suburbs of Blackburn, Nunawading and Mitcham. From Ringwood, the road is known only as Maroondah Highway and it continues north-east past Croydon towards Lilydale where it becomes a rural highway.  There is a moderately steep and moderately twisty section through forest between Healesville and Buxton, and the road then continues through farmland all the way through to Mansfield via Alexandra and Bonnie Doon.

History
In the 1850s, Whitehorse Road was built to be the primary route from Melbourne to Gippsland, a rather circuitous route which went via the Dandenong Ranges. Today the primary route is now via the Monash and Princes Freeways.

The traffic led to the establishment of a hotel in Box Hill named the White Horse hotel which had been named for a horse belonging to Captain Elgar, a property owner in the area. It is this hotel of which the road obtained its name. However, the hotel was forced to shut its doors in 1921 when Box Hill became a dry area. A replica of the white horse from the roof of the hotel now stands in the median strip of Whitehorse Road, while the restored original is located in the Box Hill Town Hall.

The passing of the Highways and Vehicles Act of 1924 through the Parliament of Victoria provided for the declaration of State Highways, roads two-thirds financed by the State government through the Country Roads Board (later VicRoads). The Maroondah Highway was declared a State Highway in the 1947/48 financial year, from Union Road in Surrey Hills via Lilydale, Healesville, Alexandra, Yarck and Merton to Mansfield (for a total of 116 miles); before this declaration, the roads were referred to as (Main) Healesville Road, Healesville-Alexandra Road, Yarck Road and Mansfield Road. The Maroondah Link Highway was later declared in June 1983 along the former Cathkin-Mansfield Road.

The Maroondah Highway was signed as Metropolitan Route 34 between Deepdene and Lilydale in 1965, later extended to Alexandra in 1986, and signed State Route 153 between Yarck and Mansfield in 1986. With Victoria's conversion to the newer alphanumeric system in the late 1990s, Metropolitan Route 34 was truncated back to Lilydale, and replaced by routes B300 between Lilydale and Coldstream, route B360 between Coldstream and Alexandra, C516 between Koriella and Yarck, B300 between Yarck and Maindample, and B320 between Maindample and Mansfield. Maroondah Link Highway was signed State Route 153 between Cathkin and Yarck in 1986, and was later replaced by route B300.

The passing of the Road Management Act 2004 granted the responsibility of overall management and development of Victoria's major arterial roads to VicRoads: in 2004, VicRoads declared this road as Whitehorse Road (Arterial #5996), beginning from Burke Road in Balwyn and ending at Union Road, Surrey Hills, as Maroondah Highway (Arterial #6720), from Burke Road to where it meets Midland Highway in Manfield (this declaration overlaps the Whitehorse Road declaration in its entirety, where dual-naming is observed on signposts, but confusingly such dual-naming has been signposted as far east as Mitcham Road), and as Maroondah Link Highway (Arterial #6020), from Goulburn Valley Highway in Cathkin to Maroondah Highway in Yarck.

Major intersections and towns

See also

 Highways in Australia
 Highways in Victoria

References

Highways and freeways in Melbourne
Streets in Melbourne
Highways in Victoria (Australia)
Transport in the City of Maroondah
Transport in the City of Whitehorse
Transport in the City of Boroondara
Transport in the Shire of Yarra Ranges
Shire of Murrindindi
Shire of Mansfield